Dissimilatory nitrate reduction to ammonium (DNRA), also known as nitrate/nitrite ammonification, is the result of anaerobic respiration by chemoorganoheterotrophic microbes using nitrate (NO3−) as an electron acceptor for respiration. In anaerobic conditions microbes which undertake DNRA oxidise organic matter and use nitrate (rather than oxygen) as an electron acceptor, reducing it to nitrite, then ammonium (NO3−→NO2−→NH4+).

Dissimilatory nitrate reduction to ammonium is more common in prokaryotes but may also occur in eukaryotic microorganisms. DNRA is a component of the terrestrial and oceanic nitrogen cycle. Unlike denitrification, it acts to conserve bioavailable nitrogen in the system, producing soluble ammonium rather than unreactive dinitrogen gas.

Background and process

Cellular process 
Dissimilatory nitrate reduction to ammonium is a two step process, reducing NO3− to NO2− then NO2− to NH4+, though the reaction may begin with NO2− directly. Each step is mediated by a different enzyme, the first step of dissimilatory nitrate reduction to ammonium is usually mediated by a periplasmic nitrate reductase. The second step (respiratory NO2− reduction to NH4+) is mediated by cytochrome c nitrite reductase, occurring at the periplasmic membrane surface. Despite DNRA not producing N2O as an intermediate during nitrate reduction (as denitrification does) N2O may still be released as a byproduct, thus DNRA may also act as a sink of fixed, bioavailable nitrogen. DNRA's production of N2O may be enhanced at higher pH levels.

Denitrification 
Dissimilatory nitrate reduction to ammonium is similar to the process of denitrification, though NO2− is reduced farther to NH4+ rather than to N2, transferring eight electrons. Both denitrifiers and nitrate ammonifiers are competing for NO3− in the environment. Despite the redox potential of dissimilatory nitrate reduction to ammonium being lower than denitrification and producing less Gibbs free energy, energy yield of denitrification may not be efficiently conserved in its series of enzymatic reactions and nitrate ammonifiers may achieve higher growth rates and outcompete denitrifiers. This is may be especially pronounced when NO3− is limiting compared to organic carbon, as organic carbon is oxidised more 'efficiently' per NO3− (as each molecule NO3− is reduced farther). The balance of denitrification and DNRA is important to the nitrogen cycle of an environment as both use NO3− but, unlike denitrification, which produces gaseous, non-bioavailable N2 (a sink of nitrogen), DNRA produces bioavailable, soluble NH4+.

Marine context

Marine microorganisms 
As dissimilatory nitrate reduction to ammonium is an anaerobic respiration process, marine microorganisms capable of performing DNRA are most commonly found in environments low in O2, such as oxygen minimum zones (OMZs) in the water column, or sediments with steep O2 gradients.

DNRA has been documented in prokaryotes inhabiting the upper layer of marine sediments. For example, benthic sulfur bacteria in genera such as Beggiatoa and Thioploca inhabit anoxic sediments on continental shelves and obtain energy by oxidizing sulfide via DNRA. These bacteria are able to carry out DNRA using intracellular nitrate stored in vacuoles. The direct reduction of nitrate to ammonium via dissimilatory nitrate reduction, coupled with the direct conversion of ammonium to dinitrogen via Anammox, has been attributed to significant nitrogen loss in certain parts of the ocean; this DNRA-Anammox coupling by DNRA and Anammox bacteria can account for nitrate loss in areas with no detectable denitrification, such as in OMZs off the coast of Chile, Peru, and Namibia, as well as OMZs over the Omani Shelf in the Arabian Sea. While denitrification is more energetically favourable than DNRA, there is evidence that bacteria using DNRA conserve more energy than denitrifiers, allowing them to grow faster. Thus, via DNRA-Anammox coupling, bacteria using DNRA and Anammox may be stronger competitors for substrates than denitrifiers.

While dissimilatory nitrate reduction to ammonium is more commonly associated with prokaryotes, recent research has found increasing evidence of DNRA in various eukaryotic microorganisms. Of the known DNRA-capable fungal species, one is found in marine ecosystems; an isolate of ascomycete Aspergillus terreus from an OMZ of the Arabian Sea has been found to be capable of performing DNRA under anoxic conditions. Evidence of DNRA has also been found in marine foraminifers.

More recently, it has been discovered that using intracellular nitrate stores, diatoms can carry out dissimilatory nitrate reduction to ammonium, likely for short-term survival or for entering resting stages, thereby allowing them to persist in dark and anoxic conditions. However, their metabolism is probably not sustained by DNRA for long-term survival during resting stages, as these resting stages often can be much longer than their intracellular nitrate supply would last. The use of DNRA by diatoms is a possible explanation for how they can survive buried in dark, anoxic sediment layers on the ocean floor, without being able to carry out photosynthesis or aerobic respiration. Currently, DNRA is known to be carried out by the benthic diatom Amphora coffeaeformis, as well as the pelagic diatom Thalassiosira weissflogii. As diatoms are a significant source of oceanic primary production, the ability for diatoms to perform DNRA has major implications on their ecological role, as well as their role in the marine nitrogen cycle.

Ecological role 
Unlike denitrification, which removes reactive nitrogen from the system, dissimilatory nitrate reduction to ammonium conserves nitrogen within the system. Since DNRA takes nitrate and converts it into ammonium, it does not produce N2 or N2O. Consequently, DNRA recycles nitrogen rather than causing N-loss, which leads to more sustainable primary production and nitrification.

Within an ecosystem, denitrification and DNRA can occur simultaneously. Usually DNRA is about 15% of the total nitrate reduction rate, which includes both DNRA and denitrification. However, the relative importance of each process is influenced by environmental variables. For example, DNRA is found to be three to seven times higher in sediments under fish cages than nearby sediments due to the accumulation of organic carbon.

Conditions where dissimilatory nitrate reduction to ammonium is favoured over denitrification in coastal ecosystems include the following:
 High carbon loads and high sulfate reduction rates (e.g. areas of coastal or river runoff)
 Unvegetated subtidal sediment 
 Marshes with high temperatures and sulfate reduction rates (producing high levels of sulfides), e.g. mangroves 
 High organic matter deposition (e.g. aquacultures)
 Ecosystems where organic matter has a high C/N ratio
 High electron donor (organic carbon) to acceptor (nitrate) ratio
 High summer temperatures and low NO3− concentrations

High sulfide concentration can inhibit the processes of nitrification and denitrification. Meanwhile, it can also enhance dissimilatory nitrate reduction to ammonium since high sulfide concentration provides more electron donors.

Ecosystems where DNRA is dominant have less nitrogen loss, resulting in higher levels of preserved nitrogen in the system. Within sediments, the total dissimilatory nitrate reduction to ammonium rate is higher in spring and summer compared to autumn. Prokaryotes are the major contributors for DNRA during summer, while eukaryotes and prokaryotes contribute similarly to DNRA during spring and autumn.

Potential benefits of using dissimilatory nitrate reduction to ammonium for individual organisms may include the following:
 Detoxification of accumulated nitrite: if an enzyme uses nitrate as an electron acceptor and produces nitrite, it can result in high levels of intracellular nitrite concentrations that can be toxic to the cell. DNRA does not store nitrite within the cell, reducing the level of toxicity.
 DNRA produces an electron sink that can be used for NADH re-oxidation: the need for having an electron sink is more apparent when the environment is nitrate-limited.

Changes to f-ratio calculation 
The balance of dissimilatory nitrate reduction to ammonium and denitrification alters the accuracy of f-ratio calculations. The f-ratio is used to quantify the efficiency of the biological pump, which reflects sequestering of carbon from the atmosphere to the deep sea. The f-ratio is calculated using estimates of 'new production' (primary productivity stimulated by nutrients entering the photic zone from outside the photic zone, for example from the deep ocean) and 'regenerated production' (primary productivity stimulated by nutrients already in the photic zone, released by remineralisation). Calculations of the f-ratio use the nitrogen species stimulating primary productivity as a proxy for the type of production occurring; productivity stimulated by NH4+ rather than NO3− is 'regenerated production'. DNRA also produces NH4+ (in addition to remineralisation) but from organic matter which has been exported from the photic zone; this may be subsequently reintroduced by mixing or upwelling of deeper water back to the surface, thereby, stimulating primary productivity; thus, in areas where high amounts of DNRA is occurring, f-ratio calculations will not be accurate.

References 

Anaerobic digestion
Cellular respiration